Alyki is a village of the Pydna-Kolindros municipality. Before the 2011 local government reform it was part of the municipality of Pydna, of which it was a municipal district. The 2011 census recorded 34 inhabitant in the village. Alyki is a part of the community of Pydna.

See also
 List of settlements in the Pieria regional unit

References

Populated places in Pieria (regional unit)